The Mali national cricket team is the team that represents Mali in international cricket. The Malian Cricket Federation (FCM) became an affiliate member of the International Cricket Council (ICC) in 2005 and an associate member in 2017.

History

In April 2018, the ICC decided to grant full Twenty20 International (T20I) status to all its members. Therefore, all Twenty20 matches played between Mali and other ICC members after 1 January 2019 will be a full T20I.

Mali made its international T20 debut at the 2022–23 ICC Men's T20 World Cup Africa Qualifier, playing in the Qualifier A group, losing 5 of its 7 matches, with the other 2 being no-results.

Records and Statistics

International Match Summary — Mali
 
Last updated 24 November 2022

Twenty20 International 
T20I record versus other nations

Records complete to T20I #1919. Last updated 24 November 2022.

See also
 List of Mali Twenty20 International cricketers
 Mali women's national cricket team
 Malian Cricket Federation

References

Cricket in Mali
National cricket teams
Cricket
Mali in international cricket